The Chourre-class aircraft repair ship was a class of repair ships that were operated by the United States Navy during World War II.

Design 

Chourre-class was the first ship class to be designated as aircraft repair ships in the Navy. The class consists of two ships converted from the EC2-S-C1, also known as Liberty ships.

The engine was built by the Babcock & Wilcox.

They served well throughout the war without a ship being lost to enemy action. After the war, they were decommissioned but only Chourre was reactive to take part in the Korean War.

Ships in the class

References

World War II auxiliary ships of the United States
Korean War auxiliary ships of the United States
Ships built in Baltimore
Chourre-class aircraft repair ships